The Advice is the first major label studio album from The Advice. Inpop Records released the album on March 26, 2013. The Advice worked with themselves along with Chuck Butler, Matt Houston, Rusty Varenkamp, in the production of this album.

Critical reception

Awarding the album three stars for Jesus Freak Hideout, Timothy Estabrooks writes, "In terms of pure artistic creativity and spiritual depth, this album is simply lacking." Sarah Fine, giving the album four stars at New Release Tuesday, states, "The album possesses strong points, some more than others, but paints a great overall picture of The Advice's passionate heart and unique mission for the music they create." Rating the album three stars from Indie Vision Music, Jonathan Andre says, "Well done guys for creating a solid album full of themes to ponder and discuss".

Track listing

References

2013 albums
Inpop Records albums